My New Gun is a 1992 American black comedy film directed by Stacy Cochran. It stars Diane Lane, James Le Gros, Stephen Collins, and Tess Harper, and also features an early minor role for Philip Seymour Hoffman.

Plot
A New Jersey doctor named Gerald buys his trophy wife, Debbie, a revolver against her wishes. Trouble ensues when their eccentric slacker neighbor, Skippy, takes the gun and doesn't want to give it back. After an accident lands Gerald in the hospital, it's up to Debbie to get the gun back (and try to figure out why Skippy wanted to borrow it in the first place). But things get a little more complicated…

Cast

Production
My New Gun was shot on a budget of $2.1 million, financed from IRS Media and Columbia-TriStar HomeVideo. It was shot on location in Teaneck, New Jersey, and a townhouse was used for the interior of multiple homes.

Reception
On Rotten Tomatoes the film has an approval rating of 50% based on reviews from 6 critics.

Terrence Rafferty of The New Yorker praised Cochran's directorial debut, writing that "The assurance she shows in handling even a brief expository scene is astonishing. [...] This film school graduate has a kind of 'technique' that can't be taught. [...] The sort of liberation that My New Gun proposes, and embodies, is the product of a true filmmaker's vision".

The film was praised by another critic for its "masterfully understated structure" and eccentricities, which some considered to be influenced by Thelma and Louise or an update of Henrik Ibsen's A Doll's House.

Emanuel Levy has noted the way in which "the gifted director Stacy Cochran examines suburbia in a manner devoid of the usually nasty, mean-spirited approach to the subject", and unlike other downtown New York films, it "displays no irony or condescension; yet its quirkily laconic, minimalist perspective goes against expectations."

References

External links
 

1992 films
1992 independent films
1990s black comedy films
American black comedy films
American independent films
American satirical films
Films directed by Stacy Cochran
Films set in New Jersey
Films shot in New Jersey
I.R.S. Media films
1992 directorial debut films
1992 comedy films
1990s English-language films
1990s American films